Victoria Ilicheva (born 5 June 1993) is a Russian female acrobatic gymnast. With partners Valeriia Belkina and Alena Kholod, Ilicheva achieved silver in the 2014 Acrobatic Gymnastics World Championships.

References

External links

 

1993 births
Living people
Russian acrobatic gymnasts
Female acrobatic gymnasts
21st-century Russian women